Wilhermsdorf is a municipality  in the district of Fürth in Bavaria in Germany. As of 2020 it has a population of 5,479. It is twinned with Feld am See in Austria and Jahnsdorf, also in Germany.

Neighboring municipalities
Wilhermsdorf borders

Emskirchen
Langenzenn
Großhabersdorf
Dietenhofen
Neuhof an der Zenn
Markt Erlbach

References

Fürth (district)